Purpurellus pinniger is a species of sea snail, a marine gastropod mollusk in the family Muricidae, the murex snails or rock snails.

Description
The shell is bright white and glossy with irregular bands of brown. There are three strong varices bearing an irregular fluted or wavy edge, and a sharply incurved spine on the varix of later whorls.  The early whorls can appear translucent and show a brownish blue color beneath. The varix on the outer lip ends well above the siphonal canal, which is curved, and ends in a wavy flattened edge similar to the varices in shape.  The aperture is subovate and the operculum is dark brown.  Length 50 mm, width 25 mm.

Distribution
This species is found subtidally along the coast of Central America from San Marcos Island and Guaymas to Ecuador in water as deep as 82 m.

References

 Merle D., Garrigues B. & Pointier J.-P. (2011) Fossil and Recent Muricidae of the world. Part Muricinae. Hackenheim: Conchbooks. 648 pp., at p. 142.

Muricinae
Gastropods described in 1833